WKFE (1550 AM, "Radio Café 1550") is a radio station licensed to serve Yauco, Puerto Rico.  The station is owned by Media Power Group, Inc. WKFE is part of the Radio Isla Network. It airs a Spanish language News Talk Information format. The station shares with translator station W228EF 93.5 FM in Mayagüez.

The station was assigned the WKFE call letters by the Federal Communications Commission.

Ownership
In July 1999, Uno Radio of Ponce Inc., Caguas, P.R. (Jesus M. Soto, chairman) reached an agreement to purchase five radio stations in Puerto Rico from Ponce Broadcasting Corp. (Jenaro G. Scarano Sr., Julio C. Braum, Luis F. Sala, Catalina Scarano and Sala Business Corp., shareholders) for a reported sale price of $10.75 million.

In June 2003, Media Power Group Inc. (Eduardo Rivero Albino, chairman, Gilberto Rivera Gutierrez, Jose E. Fernandez and Joe Pagan, shareholders) reached an agreement to purchase four AM radio stations in Puerto Rico, including WKFE, from Uno Radio Group. (Jesus M. Soto, owner) for a reported $6.8 million.

Translator stations

References

External links

KFE
Radio stations established in 1961
Yauco, Puerto Rico
1961 establishments in Puerto Rico